Fremont Township is a township in Winneshiek County, Iowa, USA.

History
Fremont Township was established in 1856. It is named for John C. Frémont.

References

Townships in Winneshiek County, Iowa
Townships in Iowa